In mathematics, particularly in dynamical systems, Arnold tongues (named after Vladimir Arnold) are a pictorial phenomenon that occur when visualizing how the rotation number of a dynamical system, or other related invariant property thereof, changes according to two or more of its parameters. The regions of constant rotation number have been observed, for some dynamical systems, to form geometric shapes that resemble tongues, in which case they are called Arnold tongues.

Arnold tongues are observed in a large variety of natural phenomena that involve oscillating quantities, such as concentration of enzymes and substrates in biological processes and cardiac electric waves. Sometimes the frequency of oscillation depends on, or is constrained (i.e., phase-locked or mode-locked, in some contexts) based on some quantity, and it is often of interest to study this relation. For instance, the outset of a tumor triggers in the area a series of substance (mainly proteins) oscillations that interact with each other; simulations show that these interactions cause Arnold tongues to appear, that is, the frequency of some oscillations constrain the others, and this can be used to control tumor growth.

Other examples where Arnold tongues can be found include the inharmonicity of musical instruments, orbital resonance and tidal locking of orbiting moons, mode-locking in fiber optics and phase-locked loops and other electronic oscillators, as well as in cardiac rhythms, heart arrhythmias and cell cycle.

One of the simplest physical models that exhibits mode-locking consists of two rotating disks connected by a weak spring. One disk is allowed to spin freely, and the other is driven by a motor. Mode locking occurs when the freely-spinning disk turns at a frequency that is a rational multiple of that of the driven rotator.

The simplest mathematical model that exhibits mode-locking is the circle map, which attempts to capture the motion of the spinning disks at discrete time intervals.

Standard circle map

Arnold tongues appear most frequently when studying the interaction between oscillators, particularly in the case where one oscillator drives another. That is, one oscillator depends on the other but not other way around, so they do not mutually influence each other as happens in Kuramoto models, for example. This is a particular case of driven oscillators, with a driving force that has a periodic behaviour. As a practical example, heart cells (the external oscillator) produce periodic electric signals to stimulate heart contractions (the driven oscillator); here, it could be useful to determine the relation between the frequency of the oscillators, possibly to design better artificial pacemakers. The family of circle maps serves as a useful mathematical model for this biological phenomenon, as well as many others.

The family of circle maps are functions (or endomorphisms) of the circle to itself. It is mathematically simpler to consider a point in the circle as being a point  in the real line that should be interpreted modulo , representing the angle at which the point is located in the circle. With this in mind, the family of circle maps is given by:

Note that if  for all  the particle simply walks around the circle at  units at a time; in particular, if  is irrational the map reduces to an irrational rotation.

The particular circle map originally studied by Arnold, and which continues to prove useful even nowadays, is:

where  is called coupling strength, and  should be interpreted modulo .

Deriving the circle map

Another way to view the circle map is as follows. Consider a function  that decreases linearly with slope . Once it reaches zero, its value is reset to a certain oscillating value, described by a function . We are now interested in the sequence of times  at which y(t) reaches zero.

This model tells us that at time  it is valid that . From this point,  will then decrease linearly until , where the function  is zero, thus yielding:

and by choosing  and  we obtain the circle map discussed previously:

In this model, a phase-locking of  would mean that  is reset exactly  times every  periods of the sinusoidal . The rotation number, in turn, would be the quotient .

Properties

Consider the general family of circle endomorphisms:

where, for the standard circle map, we have that . Sometimes it will also be convenient to represent the circle map in terms of a mapping :

We now proceed to listing some interesting properties of these circle endomorphisms.

P2. When expanding the recurrence relation, one obtains a formula for :

P3. Suppose that , so they are periodic fixed points of period .

P4. For any , it is true that , which in turn means that . Because of this, for many purposes it does not matter if the iterates  are taken modulus  or not.

P5 (translational symmetry). Suppose that for a given  there is a  phase-locking in the system. This also means that if  is a periodic orbit for parameter , then it is also a periodic orbit for any .

P6. For  there will be phase-locking whenever  is a rational.

Mode locking

For small to intermediate values of K (that is, in the range of K = 0 to about K = 1), and certain values of Ω, the map exhibits a phenomenon called mode locking or phase locking.  In a phase-locked region, the values θn advance essentially as a rational multiple of n, although they may do so chaotically on the small scale.

The limiting behavior in the mode-locked regions is given by the rotation number.

which is also sometimes referred to as the map winding number.

The phase-locked regions, or Arnold tongues, are illustrated in yellow in the figure to the right. Each such V-shaped region touches down to a rational value Ω =  in the limit of K → 0. The values of (K,Ω) in one of these regions will all result in a motion such that the rotation number ω = . For example, all values of (K,Ω) in the large V-shaped region in the bottom-center of the figure correspond to a rotation number of ω = . One reason the term "locking" is used is that the individual values θn can be perturbed by rather large random disturbances (up to the width of the tongue, for a given value of K), without disturbing the limiting rotation number. That is, the sequence stays "locked on" to the signal, despite the addition of significant noise to the series θn. This ability to "lock on" in the presence of noise is central to the utility of the phase-locked loop electronic circuit.

There is  a mode-locked region for every rational number .  It is sometimes said that the circle map maps the rationals, a set of measure zero at K = 0, to a set of non-zero measure for K ≠ 0. The largest tongues, ordered by size, occur at the Farey fractions. Fixing K and taking a cross-section through this image, so that ω is plotted as a function of Ω, gives the "Devil's staircase", a shape that is generically similar to the Cantor function.
One can show that for K<1, the circle map is a diffeomorphism,  there exist only one stable solution. However as K>1 this holds no longer, and one can find regions of two overlapping locking regions. For the circle map it can be shown that in this region, no more than two stable mode locking regions can overlap, but if there is any limit to the number of overlapping Arnold tongues for general synchronised systems is not known.

The circle map also exhibits subharmonic routes to chaos, that is, period doubling of the form 3, 6, 12, 24,....

Chirikov standard map
The Chirikov standard map is related to the circle map, having similar recurrence relations, which may be written as 

with both iterates taken modulo 1. In essence, the standard map introduces a momentum pn which is allowed to dynamically vary, rather than being forced fixed, as it is in the circle map. The standard map is studied in physics by means of the kicked rotor Hamiltonian.

Applications
Arnold tongues have been applied to the study of 
 Cardiac rhythms - see  and 
 Synchronisation of a resonant tunneling diode oscillators

Gallery

See also 
 Sturmian word

Notes

References

 
 
  - Provides a brief review of basic facts in section 2.12.
  - Performs a detailed analysis of heart cardiac rhythms in the context of the circle map.

External links
Circle map with interactive Java applet

Chaotic maps